Office of Future Plans is a studio album by the band Office of Future Plans. It was released on November 21, 2011. It is the band's only album.

The album is dedicated to Iain Burgess.

Track listing
 "Salamander"
 "Lorelei"
 "Harden Your Heart"
 "Ambitious Wrists"
 "The Loyal Opposition"
 "Your Several Selves"
 "Abandon"
 "You're Not Alone"
 "The Beautiful Barricades"
 "FEMA Coffins"
 "Dumb It Down"
 "Riddle Me This"

Personnel
 J. Robbins - guitar, vocals
 Gordon Withers - cello, guitar
 Brooks Harlan - bass guitar, vocals
 Darren Zentek - drums

References

2011 debut albums
Office of Future Plans albums
Dischord Records albums